Robert Palmer Browne (30 January 1803 – 18 December 1872) was a British architect who was closely associated with the General Steam Navigation Company in the mid-nineteenth century but who also designed residential, church and public buildings, some of which are now listed by Historic England.

Early life
Robert Browne was born in 1803 to Robert and Winfield Browne.

Career
He was the architect and surveyor to the General Steam Navigation Company of London. He was responsible for a number of the firm's works at Coldharbour in London after they bought land and leases there from 1842. These included two piers in front of the pre-existing Brown's Wharf and Stewart's Wharf, and a new wharf at London Bridge in the 1860s.

In 1860 he was practising from 15 Royal Place, Royal Hill, Greenwich.

Death
Browne died at Royal Place, Greenwich, on 18 December 1872. His executor was his brother George Henry Browne, gentleman. He left an estate of under £8,000.

Notable works
 Woolwich Road Workhouse and Vanburgh Hill Infirmary, East Greenwich. (1839)
 St Mary Magdalene Church, St Marys Road, Peckham, London. (1839–41)
 1 to 31 Westbourne Terrace, London. Grade II listed. (by 1849)
 Petham House, Kent, for  Thomas Henry Mackay. (c.1850)

References 

1803 births
1872 deaths
Architects from London
People from Lambeth